The 1985–86 Sheffield Shield season was the 84th season of the Sheffield Shield, the domestic first-class cricket competition of Australia. New South Wales won the championship.

Table

Final

Statistics

Most Runs
Mark Taylor 903

Most Wickets
Jeff Thomson 42

References

Sheffield Shield
Sheffield Shield
Sheffield Shield seasons